Dynamine is a genus of nymphalid butterflies found in South America.

Species

Listed alphabetically:
Dynamine aerata (Butler, 1877)
Dynamine agacles (Dalman, 1823)
Dynamine agatha (Oberthür, 1916)
Dynamine amplias (Hewitson, 1859)
Dynamine anubis (Hewitson, 1859)
Dynamine arene Hübner, [1823]
Dynamine artemisia (Fabricius, 1793)
Dynamine ate (Godman & Salvin, [1883])
Dynamine athemon (Linnaeus, 1758)
Dynamine chryseis (Bates, 1865)
Dynamine coenus (Fabricius, 1793)
Dynamine colombiana Talbot, 1932
Dynamine davinae Brévignon, 2008
Dynamine dyonis Geyer, 1837
Dynamine erchia (Hewitson, 1852)
Dynamine gisella (Hewitson, 1857)
Dynamine haenschi Hall, 1917
Dynamine hecuba (Schaus, 1913)
Dynamine ines (Godart, [1824])
Dynamine intermedia Talbot, 1932
Dynamine laugieri (Oberthür, 1916)
Dynamine meridionalis Röber, 1915
Dynamine myrrhina (Doubleday, 1849)
Dynamine myrson (Doubleday, 1849)
Dynamine neoris (Hewitson, 1859)
Dynamine onias (Hewitson, 1857)
Dynamine paulina (Bates, 1865)
Dynamine pebana Staudinger, [1885]
Dynamine perpetua (Bates, 1865)
Dynamine persis (Hewitson, 1859)
Dynamine postverta (Cramer, [1780])
Dynamine racidula (Hewitson, 1852)
Dynamine sara (Bates, 1865)
Dynamine serina (Fabricius, 1775)
Dynamine setabis (Doubleday, 1849)
Dynamine sosthenes (Hewitson, 1869)
Dynamine theseus (C. & R. Felder, 1861)
Dynamine tithia (Hübner, [1823])
Dynamine vicaria (Bates, 1865)
Dynamine zenobia (Bates, 1865)

References

 , 1930: New forms of Nymphalidae (Rhopalocera) in the collection of the British Museum. The Entomologist 63: 156-160.
 , 2004: Atlas of Neotropical Lepidoptera; Checklist:Part 4A; Hesperioidea-Papilionoidea.
 , 2010: A new species of Dynamine Hübner, [1819] from northwestern Ecuador (Lepidoptera: Nymphalidae: Biblidinae). Tropical Lepidoptera Research 20 (1): 23-27.

Biblidinae
Nymphalidae of South America
Butterflies of Trinidad and Tobago
Nymphalidae genera
Taxa named by Jacob Hübner